The 1950 Miami Redskins football team was an American football team that represented Miami University during the 1950 college football season. In their second and final season under head coach Woody Hayes, the Redskins compiled a 9–1 record, outscored opponents by a combined total of 251 to 163, and defeated Arizona State, 34–21, in the 1951 Salad Bowl. Ara Parseghian was an assistant coach, and Bo Schembechler played at the tackle position on the team.

Schedule

References

Miami
Miami RedHawks football seasons
Mid-American Conference football champion seasons
Salad Bowl champion seasons
Miami Redskins football